Dresden I is an electoral constituency (German: Wahlkreis) represented in the Bundestag. It elects one member via first-past-the-post voting. Under the current constituency numbering system, it is designated as constituency 159. It is located in central Saxony, comprising the southern part of the city of Dresden.

Dresden I was created for the inaugural 1990 federal election after German reunification. Since 2021, it has been represented by Markus Reichel of the Christian Democratic Union (CDU).

Geography
Dresden I is located in central Saxony. As of the 2021 federal election, it comprises the Ortsamtsbereiche of Altstadt, Blasewitz, Leuben, Plauen, and Prohlis from the independent city of Dresden.

History
Dresden I was created after German reunification in 1990. In the 1990 through 1998 elections, it was constituency 318 in the numbering system. In the 2002 through 2009 elections, it was number 160. Since 2013, it has been number 159.

Originally, the constituency comprised the Stadtbezirke of Ost and Süd from the city of Dresden. It acquired its current borders in the 2002 election.

Members
The constituency was first represented by Hans Geisler of the Christian Democratic Union (CDU) from 1990 to 1994, when he was succeeded by Christa Reichard from 1994 to 2005. Andreas Lämmel was elected in 2005, and re-elected in 2009, 2013, and 2017. He was succeeded by Markus Reichel in 2021.

Election results

2021 election

2017 election

2013 election

2009 election

2005 election
Due to the death of NPD candidate Kerstin Lorenz, voting in Dresden I was delayed for two weeks, taking place on 2 October 2005.

2002 election

References

Federal electoral districts in Saxony
1990 establishments in Germany
Constituencies established in 1990
Politics of Dresden